Sabina Telenská (born 14 April 1974) is a Czech rower. She competed at the 1992 Summer Olympics in Barcelona for Czechoslovakia with the women's eight where they came eighths. At the 1996 Summer Olympics in Atlanta, she competed for the Czech Republic in the coxless pair where they came ninth.

References

1974 births
Living people 
Czech female rowers
Olympic rowers of Czechoslovakia
Olympic rowers of the Czech Republic
Rowers at the 1992 Summer Olympics
Rowers at the 1996 Summer Olympics
Rowers from Prague